Valea Lacului may refer to the following rivers in Romania:

 Valea Lacului, a tributary of the Barcău in Bihor County
 Pârâul Lacului, a tributary of the Bega Veche in Timiș County
 Valea Lacului, a tributary of the Lotru in Vâlcea County
 Valea Lacului Roșu, a tributary of the Azuga in Brașov County